McGonagle Site, RI-1227 is a historic site in Scituate, Rhode Island.

The house on the site was constructed in 1807 and the house and cemetery were added to the National Register of Historic Places in 1985.

References

Scituate, Rhode Island
Houses on the National Register of Historic Places in Rhode Island
Cemeteries on the National Register of Historic Places in Rhode Island
Houses in Providence County, Rhode Island
National Register of Historic Places in Providence County, Rhode Island
Houses completed in 1807